Buzy-en-Béarn is a railway station in Buzy, Nouvelle-Aquitaine, France. The station opened in 1883 and is located on the Pau–Canfranc railway line. The station is served by TER (local) services operated by the SNCF. The station was also located on the Buzy - Laruns railway line which closed in 1969.

Train services
The following services currently call at Buzy:
local service (TER Nouvelle-Aquitaine) Pau - Oloron-Sainte-Marie - Bedous

References

Railway stations in Pyrénées-Atlantiques
Railway stations in France opened in 1883